Telde is a town and a municipality in the eastern part of the island of Gran Canaria, Canary Islands, overseas (Atlantic) insular Spain.

The city is the oldest and the first capital of the island of Gran Canaria, founded before 1351, a former medieval bishopric and present Catholic titular see.

The city Telde is located 4 km from the coast and 16 km south of the island capital Las Palmas. The GC-1 motorway passes east of the city. The Gran Canaria International Airport is located in the subdivision of Gando, south of Telde.

History 
Before the Spanish invasion Telde was the eastern centre to the aborigines of the island, and the renowned aborigen Doramas is believed to have lived here. Early records point to about 14,000 aborigen dwellings here in Telde at the time of conquest, and Telde is the spot where the famous Idolo de Tara figure—currently housed in the Museo Canario in Las Palmas—was discovered.

It was created by papal decree is 1351. Today Telde is Gran Canaria's second city with a population over 100,000. The historic old town area of Telde is particularly popular with visitors.

Ecclesiastical History 
The Diocese of Islas de la Fortuna (español) / Isola de Fortunate (Italiano) / Insulas Fortunatis (Latin) (meaning 'Fortunate islands', the nickname of the Canaries) was established on 7 November 1351. The territory split off from the Balearic Diocese of Mallorca, as suffragan of the (Andalusian) Metropolitan Archdiocese of Seville.

Renamed in 1369 after its see as Diocese of Telde (Spanish) / Telden(sis) (Latin adjective).

On 7 July 1404 it lost territory to establish the Diocese of Rubicon.

In 1441 it was suppressed, without direct successor.

Residential Ordinaries 
(all Roman Rite and members of Latin congregations)

Suffragan Bishops of Islas de la Fortuna 
 Bernardo Font, Carmelite Order (O. Carm.) (1351.11.07 – 1354), next Bishop of Santa Giusta (1354–?)
 Bartolomé, Dominican Order (O.P.) (1361.03.02 – 1362)

Suffragan Bishops of Telde 
 Bonanat Tarí, Friars Minor (O.F.M.) (1369.07.02 – 1392)
 Jaime Olzina, O.P. (1392.01.31 – 1441)

Titular see 
In 1969 the diocese was nominally restored as Latin Titular bishopric of Telde (Spanish) / Telden(sis) (Latin adjective).

It has had the following incumbents, none yet of the fitting Episcopal (lowest) rank:
 Titular Archbishop: William Aquin Carew (1969.11.27 – 2012.05.08) as papal diplomat : Apostolic Nuncio (ambassador) to Burundi (1969.11.27 – 1974.05.10), Apostolic Nuncio to Rwanda (1969.11.27 – 1974.05.10), Apostolic Pro-Nuncio to Cyprus (1974.05.10 – 1983.08.30), Apostolic Delegate to Jerusalem and Palestine (1974.05.10 – 1983.08.30), Apostolic Pro-Nuncio to Japan (1983.08.30 – retired 1997.11.11); died 2012
Titular Archbishop Giampiero Gloder (2013.09.21 – ...), President of Pontifical Ecclesiastical Academy, Vice-Chamberlain of the Holy Roman Church of Apostolic Camera; previously Head of Office for special affairs of Secretariat of State (2005 – 2013.09.21).

Economy 

In the past, Telde was an agricultural community, the main crops being sugar canes, vineyards, bananas and tomatoes. Today the surrounding area of Telde is quite heavily industrialised, becoming the industrial centre on the island.

Two airlines are headquartered at Gran Canaria Airport: Binter Canarias and Canaryfly.

Main sights 
The church San Juan Bautista (John the Baptist) de Telde is the true spiritual centre of Telde. Located in the square of the same name and founded in 1483, the old church was erected by the Garcia del Castillo family at the time of the town's foundation. It still has the original gateway, an example of Sevillian-Portuguese Gothic architecture. The towers, however, are an example of early 20th neo-Gothic construction. The real marvels are inside the building: the statue of Christ on the main altar, made from corn dough by the Purépecha Mexican Indians, brought here before 1550, the Flemish Gothic main altar, which dates back to before 1516, and the triptych of the Virgin Mary, brought from Flanders, also in the 16th century, depicting five religious scenes.

Telde has 101 archaeological sites and 709 listed sites of ethnographic interest. The number of sites increases each year, as do new aspects of old fields, but most are in disrepair and many are disappearing. Some of the most prominent are the coastal town of Tufia, in good condition and extensively excavated by archaeologists; Four Doors (Cuatro Puertas), a large cave with four doors located on top of a mountain overlooking the plain adjoined to a village of cave houses with collective barn at the back; the caves of Tara and Cendro, remains of the ancient centre of population; the town of Draguillo on the border with Ingenio; las cuevas Chalasia which consist of a labyrinthine series of artificial caves linked by tunnels; and the impressive necropolis of Jinámar which includes more than 500 tombs of various types.

Climate 
Telde has a moderate desert climate.

Education 

Lycée Français René-Verneau, the French international school of Gran Canaria, is located in Telde.

Sister cities 
  San Cristóbal de La Laguna, Tenerife, Spain
  Gáldar, Gran Canaria, Spain
  Moguer, Spain, birthplace of Telde's founder, Cristóbal García del Castillo
  Chongqing, China, birth city of Sanmao, writer who lived in the island

Notable locals 
 Roque Mesa (born 1989), footballer

Gallery

See also 
 List of municipalities in Las Palmas
 List of Catholic dioceses in Spain, Andorra, Ceuta and Gibraltar

References

Sources and external links 

 GCatholic with Google satellite photo

Populated places established in the 1350s
1351 establishments
14th-century establishments in Spain
Municipalities in Gran Canaria
Catholic titular sees in Europe